Bruna bruna is a species of skipper butterfly in the family Hesperiidae. It is the only species in the monotypic genus Bruna.

References
Natural History Museum Lepidoptera genus database

Hesperiinae
Monotypic butterfly genera
Hesperiidae genera